Upton is a hamlet and census-designated place (CDP) on Long Island in the town of Brookhaven. It is the home of the Brookhaven National Laboratory and a National Weather Service weather forecast office.

Upton is located on eastern Long Island in Suffolk County, New York,  United States.

The town is so named because it was the site of the U.S. Army's Camp Upton, which was active from 1917 until 1920, and again from 1940 until 1946. During World War II, the camp was rebuilt primarily as an induction center for draftees.  The Army was later to use the site as a convalescent and rehabilitation hospital for returning wounded.

The 32 megawatt (MW) Long Island Solar Farm (LISF), located in Upton, is the largest photovoltaic array in the eastern United States. The LISF is made up of 164,312 solar panels which provide enough electricity for roughly 4,500 households. The project will cause the abatement of more than 30,000 metric tons of carbon dioxide emissions per year. It earned the Best Photovoltaic Project of Year Award from the New York Solar Energy Industries Association.

Since October 1993, Upton has been the home of the National Weather Service New York City Weather Forecast Office (WFO code "OKX"), which serves the New York metropolitan area. It is located on the grounds of Brookhaven National Laboratory.

References

External links
 http://www.longwood.k12.ny.us/community/longwood_journey/modern_history/camp_upton/

Brookhaven, New York
Hamlets in New York (state)
Hamlets in Suffolk County, New York